is an autobahn near Munich in southern Germany, connecting Starnberg with the Autobahndreieck Starnberg exchange. In Starnberg, it merges into Bundesstraße 2, which it replaces between Starnberg and the Dreieck Starnberg junction.

Exit list 

 (Ostteil)
 (Westteil)

|}

External links 

952
A952